East Campbelltown Eagles are an Australian Junior Rugby League Club that also supports a semi-professional rugby league team. The team previously competed in the Western Suburbs 1st Grade competition, Canterbury 1st Grade competition, Jim Beam Cup, Bundaberg Red Cup, the Wests Juniors/Group 6 combined competition, Group 6 CRL Competition and now the Semi Professional New South Wales Sydney Shield Competition.

History

The East Campbelltown Eagles RLFC was established in 1961 as a junior Rugby League club from the Campbelltown East Primary School. Starting with the colors Red and White which came from the local bus company situated on Broughton Street. The Club had a full Red jersey with white saddles on their shoulders, a big letter E on the heart side of the jersey, white shorts and striped socks. 
East Campbelltown was originally part of the Group 6 Country Rugby League. The Club's first home ground was Orana Park Leumeah from 1961 until 1968, Orana Park is now the Campbelltown Stadium. Land on 32 Waminda Avenue was donated to the local Rugby League Club which was a small cattle farm. The majority of the houses around the East Campbelltown Area originally were chicken farms that was given to serviceman returning from World War 1 back in 1918.
  
The East Campbelltown Rugby League Club then moved to the new ground on Waminda Avenue, the name Waminda is an Aboriginal word for Comrade, which obviously came from the returned service men living in the area. East Campbelltown was also originally called the Settlement. Protest from the locals in the 60’s seen a name change to East Campbelltown as they thought the Settlement name was more of a name for a penal colony.

The E displayed on the East Campbelltown had opposition clubs calling the E for easy beats. The East Campbelltown President Mr E.W Lardner wanted to put a stop to the Easy Beats Tag and designed an Eagle. He then had the Eagles sown on all the jerseys with the name change to East Campbelltown Eagles in 1969. This also coincided with the move to Waminda Oval from Oranan Park in 1969.

The 1970s, East Campbelltown Eagles were a junior club that fielded teams from Under 6's to Under 16's. All players once past the age of 16 would then go and play for the senior club Campbelltown City Kangaroos. Campbelltown City had some successful years in the early 80’s that contributed from many East Campbelltown Eagles Junior players.
 
By the late 1970s, the East Campbelltown Eagles club came to life being the largest Junior Rugby League Club in the District and winning the Coca-Cola Knockout in 1977 and 1979, but it wasn’t all smooth sailing for East Campbelltown Eagles in the 70’s. A break away club named Leumeah Wolves formed on Waminda Oval field number 2. They wore the Blue and White Bulldogs strip, this gave the East Campbelltown Eagles club unwanted competition for local players.

Waminda Oval had gone through a few changes, the top field was fenced and a cricket pitch added, it wasn’t in favour for the Rugby League Club. The original farm house was demolished and made way for the current East Campbelltown Community Hall and the last house on Brisbane Avenue that backed onto Waminda Oval had the club wanting to buy it for a mere $7,000 but opposition from a Local Club wouldn’t allow the sale to go ahead. 
  
By the end of 1979 East Campbelltown Eagles with a team full of 17 year olds asked permission to Group 6 CRL for a special exemption to field an Under 18's team. To Campbelltown City's disproval it was granted for a team coached by Don Young that  became East Campbelltown’s first ever Under 18’s team in 1980. The team against all odds defeated arch rivals Campbelltown Collegians in the Grand Final at Bradbury Oval in 1980.
 
In 1980 East Campbelltown Eagles fielded 18 teams and won an amazing 8 Premierships, they had also won the Group 6 Junior Club Champions.

The end of 1983 seen the end of Group 6 in Campbelltown as Campbelltown was now seen as a small city and no longer part of the Country Rugby League. The competition was separated from what they called the water line, which was the convict built water canal that ran from the cataract dam through Narellan Road to the back of St Andrews Road, sides North-Wests of the water line were required to form the Newtown-Campbelltown Jets Rugby League, financial issues from Newtown Jets seen another Name change to Campbelltown Hornets in 1985 before the Western Suburbs Magpies District Rugby League was formed in 1986. The late 1980s to the early 1990s the club struggled sharing Waminda Oval with Leumeah Wolves which was a blue and white club that broke away from the East Campbelltown Club in 1978. When Leumeah Wolves folded in 1993 and East Campbelltown Eagles formed their senior base with now an Under 18's reserve Grade and 1st Grade they became the heavy weight club they were known for in the 70's, in many Semi final and Final 1st Grade appearances they couldn't crack that illusive Premiership until the 2001 season which was an important year for the Eagles, winning the Minor Premiership, Premiership, Senior Club Champions and Overall Club Champions, and to kick start the club's two decades of dominance at a Senior Level. The demise of the 1st Grade competition locally seen the East Campbelltown Eagles take on the best from the Canterbury District in 2007, The Eagles winning their second 1st Grade Premiership defeating Canterbury's prestigious club St Christopher's 19-12 under the coach Daniel Draper and Richard Barnes.

In 2008, the Eagles gained acceptance into the NSWRL Jim Beam Cup. Where they were the first Campbelltown side to compete in such a high level competition. The Eagles re-joined the combined Group 6-Westerns Suburbs District A-grade competition at the start of the 2009 season, where they started to dominate the competition winning the Grand Final in the Under 18's featuring NRL star Tim Lafai. That year they also made the Grand Final in Reserve Grade and 3rd Grade Competition.

By the 2011 season the club had grown in strength and became competition favorites going through the regular season with only the one loss but went down in the Grand Final, that year they still had success with the Reserve Grade winning undefeated Captain Coached by club stalwart Daniel Draper, a huge local rivalry had again formed with Campbelltown City and a record the East Campbelltown Eagles boast is that the Campbelltown City Club has never defeated East Campbelltown Eagles in any 1st Grade match.

In 2012, The East Campbelltown Eagles went through the competition undefeated winning the Group 6 Grand Final with ease 44-6 and were named winners of the CRL Clayton's Cup and were the first Campbelltown Side to win the prestigious award.  They had further success again winning the Reserve Grade competition and by 2013 the club had become a formidable powerhouse that wasn't excepted well with the Group 6 Management as the Club was voted out of the competition.  

In 2014, the Eagles had gone from rags to riches as they won the NSWRL Sydney Shield competition, going in as huge underdogs against the Mount Pritchard Mounties, the Eagles went on to win the match and the premiership.

In 2016, East Campbelltown won the Sydney Shield for a second time defeating Mounties in one of the all time upsets as Mounties went into the Grand Final winning 21 games straight.  In 2018, East Campbelltown won the Sydney Shield for a third time defeating the Guildford Owls 32-22 at Leichhardt Oval.

Team emblem and homeground
East Campbelltown's logo is that of a red and white eagle inside a ring with the words "Campbelltown Eagles R.L.F.C" written on it. This logo is similar to that of NSWRL side, Manly Sea Eagles, with the colours changed to suit the club. The colours of the Eagles' jerseys are also red and white like their emblem.

The Eagles homeground in Waminda Oval, Campbelltown.

Notable Juniors
Notable First Grade Players that have played at East Campbelltown Eagles & Campbelltown Eagles include:
Jarryd Hayne (2006-14 Parramatta Eels, 2015 San Francisco 49ers)
Peni Tagive (2008-12 West Tigers, St George Illawarra Dragons & Sydney)

Playing Record in NSWRL Competitions

Tier 4 - Sydney Shield

Tier 3
The club competed as Campbelltown Eagles in third tier competitions from 2008 to 2010 (the Jim Beam and Bundaberg Red Cups).

See also

References

External links
Campbelltown Eagles Official Site

Rugby league teams in Sydney
Rugby clubs established in 1961
1961 establishments in Australia
Campbelltown, New South Wales